The Very Best of The Stone Roses is a compilation album released by Silvertone Records in 2002. It features most of their singles plus album tracks including "Breaking into Heaven" and "This is the One", all of which were remastered for this album.  It charted at #19 in the UK and spent nine weeks in the Top 75.

The Very Best of is a fairly comprehensive compilation in that it gathers all the Stone Roses' best known tracks.  The track listing was decided upon by band members. The previous compilation The Complete Stone Roses had been criticized for not including material from the group's second album, whilst including inferior edits and alternative versions of many songs.

Not only does the compilation contain six songs from their 1989 debut but the album is structured to open and close with the same songs in their album versions. It was re-released in 2012 following their reunion when it reached 20 in the charts. As of July 2012 it has sold 552,577 copies in the United Kingdom.

Track listing

Charts

Weekly charts

Year-end charts

References

External links

The Very Best of The Stone Roses at YouTube (streamed copy where licensed)
The Stone Roses' discography

The Stone Roses albums
Albums produced by John Leckie
2002 greatest hits albums